Dead Heat is a 2002 crime comedy-drama film starring Kiefer Sutherland, Anthony LaPaglia and Radha Mitchell. It was written and directed by Mark Malone.

Plot 

Situated in Boston, Albert Paul 'Pally' LaMarr (Kiefer Sutherland) plays the role of a 35 year old police officer who has recently suffered a heart attack while facing a bandit, forcing him into retirement. The loss of his career created a void that drove him into depression and left him contemplating suicide. His wife, Charlotte LaMarr (Radha Mitchell) calls Pally's half-brother Ray LaMarr (Anthony LaPaglia) to come and visit him with the intention of bringing his spirits up. Ray is a small time crook and he convinces Pally to finance a long-shot race horse. Unknowingly, Pally becomes in over his head as Ray's new found jockey Tony LaRoche (Lothaire Bluteau) is a gambling addict who is in debt with a Mob kingpin Frank Finnegan (Daniel Benzali). Ray and Pally become guilty by association and Tony's debt is now theirs. Pally finds himself mired in murder, mobsters and misfired romance. The stakes of their new horse panning out just increase substantially.

Cast
 Kiefer Sutherland as Albert Paul "Pally" LaMarr, an ex-detective for the Boston Police.
 Anthony LaPaglia as Ray LaMarr, Pally's small time crook brother.
 Radha Mitchell as Charlotte LaMarr, Pally's ex-wife.
 Lothaire Bluteau as Tony LaRoche, A jockey with a bad gambling habit.
 Daniel Benzali as Frank Finnegan, an Irish Mob boss in Boston.
 Kay Panabaker as Samantha "Sam" LaRoche, Tony's young daughter.
 Denis Arndt as Dr. Ivan Barnes
 Alf Humphreys as Dr. Marchesi
 Charles Martin Smith as Morty
 Gary Hetherington as Captain
 Michael Benyaer as Warehouse Worker #1
 Craig Veroni as Warehouse Worker #2
 Mark Acheson as Warehouse Worker #5
 Frank Cassini as Manny
 Peter Flemming as Ted
 Gerald Paetz as Finnegan's Thug #1
 Bruce Fontaine as Finnegan's Thug #2

Production
The film used locations in Victoria and Vancouver, British Columbia. It was Sutherland's last production before his TV show, 24.

Awards and nominations
The film received two nominations in the DVD Exclusive Awards in 2003, one for Best Cinematography and for Kiefer Sutherland for Best Actor.

References

External links
 
 
 Dead Heat at LetterBoxd
 Dead Heat at Moviefone

2000s crime comedy-drama films
2002 films
Canadian crime comedy-drama films
2000s English-language films
English-language Canadian films
English-language German films
Films about families
Films about horses
Films shot in Vancouver
Films about gambling
German crime comedy-drama films
German horse racing films
Horse sports in film
2000s Canadian films
2000s German films